John Baskerville (baptised 28 January 1707 – 8 January 1775) was an English businessman, in areas including japanning and papier-mâché, but he is best remembered as a printer and type designer. He was also responsible for inventing "wove paper", which was considerably smoother than "laid paper", allowing for sharper printing results.

Life 

Baskerville was born in the village of Wolverley, near Kidderminster in Worcestershire and baptised on 28 January 1706OS(1707 NS) at Wolverley church. Baskerville established an early career teaching handwriting and is known to have offered his services cutting gravestones (a demonstration slab by him survives in the Library of Birmingham) before making a considerable fortune from the manufacture of lacquerwork items (japanning).

He practised as a printer in Birmingham, England. Baskerville was a member of the Royal Society of Arts, and an associate of some of the members of the Lunar Society. 

Baskerville directed his punchcutter, John Handy, in the design of many typefaces of broadly similar appearance. His typefaces were greatly admired by Benjamin Franklin, a fellow printer, but were criticised by jealous competitors and soon fell out of favour. He also pioneered a completely new style of typography, adding wide margins and leading between each line.

In 1757, Baskerville published a remarkable quarto edition of Virgil on wove paper, using his own type. It took three years to complete, but it made such an impact that he was appointed printer to the University of Cambridge the following year. An atheist, he nonetheless printed The Book of Common Prayer in 1762 and a splendid folio Bible in 1763.  

Baskerville innovated in printing, paper, and ink production. He worked with paper maker James Whatman to produce a smoother whiter paper, sometimes called "wove paper", which showcased his strong black type.

Death and interments 

Baskerville died in January 1775 at his home, Easy Hill. He requested that his body be placed

However, in 1821 a canal was built through the land and his body was placed on show by the landowner until Baskerville's family and friends arranged to have it moved to the crypt of Christ Church, Birmingham. Christ Church was demolished in 1897 so his remains were then moved, with other bodies from the crypt, to consecrated catacombs at Warstone Lane Cemetery. In 1963 a petition was presented to Birmingham City Council requesting that he be reburied in unconsecrated ground, according to his wishes.

Legacy 
The 20th century renewed interest in and appreciation for Baskerville's typefaces. His most notable typeface, Baskerville, is held to represent the peak of transitional type face and a bridge between Old Style and Modern type design. Since the 1920s, many fonts based on his work—mostly called 'Baskerville'— have been released by Linotype, Monotype, and other type foundries. In 1996, Emigre released a popular revival of this typeface called Mrs Eaves after Baskerville's wife, Sarah Eaves.

Commemoration 

In the 1930s, Baskerville House was built on the grounds of Easy Hill.

In 1947, BBC radio broadcast a radio play about his burial, named Hic Jacet: or The Corpse in the Crescent by Neville Brandon Watts. The original recording was not preserved but a performance was staged by students at the Birmingham School of Acting in 2013 at the Typographic Hub Centre of Birmingham City University. A copy of the script is in the Norman Painting Archives at the University of Birmingham.

A Portland stone sculpture of the Baskerville typeface, Industry and Genius, in his honour stands in front of Baskerville House in Centenary Square, Birmingham. It was created by local artist David Patten in 1990.

Gallery 
Some examples of volumes published by Baskerville.

See also 
 William Caslon, a contemporary type-founder and printer

References 

Citations

Bibliography
 
 

 
 ARCHER-PARRÉ, Caroline & Malcom DICK (Editors), JOHN BASKERVILLE: Art and industry of the enlightenment. Liverpool: Liverpool University Press, 2017. 8vo, (240x160mm), xviii,269p

External links 

Birmingham City Council page on Industry and Genius (includes picture)
Revolutionary Players website
Baskerville the Animated Movie
Some typographical studies on the use of the Baskerville font (in French).

1707 births
1775 deaths
English printers
English typographers and type designers
English atheists
People associated with the University of Cambridge
Associates of the Lunar Society of Birmingham
Artists from Birmingham, West Midlands